The 13th Toronto International Film Festival (TIFF) took place in Toronto, Ontario, Canada between September 8 and September 17, 1988. Midnight Madness programme was introduced at the festival. The festival screened more than 300 films from all over the world. Women on the Verge of a Nervous Breakdown by Pedro Almodóvar won the People's Choice Award at the festival, which later nominated for Best Foreign Language Film at Academy Award.

Dead Ringers by David Cronenberg was selected as the opening film.

Awards

Programme

Gala Presentation
Women on the Verge of a Nervous Breakdown by Pedro Almodóvar
Distant Voices, Still Lives by Terence Davies
A Short Film About Killing by Krzysztof Kieślowski
Chocolat by Claire Denis
The Last of England by Derek Jarman
Earth Girls Are Easy by Julien Temple
Track 29 by Nicolas Roeg
The Thin Blue Line by Errol Morris
Red Sorghum by Zhang Yimou
 by Krzysztof Zanussi
Love Is a Fat Woman by Alejandro Agresti
The Way Things Go by Peter Fischli & David Weiss
Tempos Difíceis by João Botelho
Rouge by Stanley Kwan 
Story of Women by Claude Chabrol
The Beast by Kevin Reynolds
Três Menos Eu by João Canijo
Madame Sousatzka by John Schlesinger
Tango Bar by Marcos Zurinaga
Ei by Danniel Danniel

Canadian Perspective
The Box of Sun (La boîte à soleil) by Jean Pierre Lefebvre
Calling the Shots by Janis Cole and Holly Dale
Comic Book Confidential by Ron Mann
Dead Ringers by David Cronenberg
The Forgotten War by Richard Boutet
Growing Up in America by Morley Markson
The Heat Line (La ligne de chaleur) by Hubert-Yves Rose
I Will Make No More Boring Art by William D. MacGillivray
Lac La Croix by Judith Doyle
Milk and Honey by Glen Salzman and Rebecca Yates
Name Your Poison It's a Scream Channel No. 5 by John Gagne
The Outside Chance of Maximilian Glick by Allan A. Goldstein
Palais Royale by Martin Lavut
Pissoir by John Greyson
The Revolving Doors (Les Portes tournantes) by Francis Mankiewicz
Shadow Dancing by Lewis Furey
Something About Love by Tom Berry
The Squamish Five by Paul Donovan
Strangers in a Strange Land by Bob McKeown
Walking After Midnight by Jonathan Kay

Midnight Madness
The Decline of Western Civilization Part II: The Metal Years by Penelope Spheeris
Big Time by Chris Blum
Hellbound: Hellraiser II by Tony Randel
Heavy Petting by Obie Benz
Forbidden to Forbid by Lothar Lambert
Smoke 'Em If You Got 'Em by Ray Boseley
Brand New Day by Amos Gitai
Brain Damage by Frank Henenlotter

References

External links
 Official site
 TIFF: A Reel History: 1976 - 2012
1988 Toronto International Film Festival at IMDb

1988
1988 film festivals
1988 in Toronto
1988 in Canadian cinema